Polyangium may refer to:
 Polyangium (flatworm), a genus of flatworms in the family Microscaphidiidae
 Polyangium (bacterium), a genus of bacteria in the family Polyangiaceae